Alpinia javanica, the Javanese alpinia, is a species of ginger occurring from Thailand to Malesia. It was first described by Carl Ludwig von Blume.

References 

javanica